Conscription in the Sri Lanka has never been implemented in modern times with its armed forces and auxiliary forces remained all volunteer during the World War I, the World War II and the Sri Lankan Civil War. The Mobilization and Supplementary Forces Act, No. 40 of 1985 gives the Sri Lankan Government the powers to issue a A National Service Order to enlist persons in the National Armed Reserve.

During the Sri Lankan Civil War, non-state sanctioned conscription was carried out by the LTTE in areas under its control, including conscription of children.

See also
Military service
Recruit training
Alternative service

References

Public policy in Sri Lanka
Military of Sri Lanka
Sri Lanka